Archives of Manitoba, formerly the Provincial Archives of Manitoba until 2003, is the official government archive of the Canadian province of Manitoba. It is located at 200 Vaughan Street in Winnipeg, where it has been established since January 1971.

It is also the official repository of the Hudson's Bay Company Archives (HBCA). The archives also holds the papers of Manitoba premier Sir Hugh John Macdonald, son of Canadian prime minister Sir John A. Macdonald.

History

History of Archives of Manitoba 
When Manitoba was first established (1870), the Provincial Secretary, among other duties, was the keeper of registers and archives of the province, under the authority of the Provincial Secretary's Act. The Secretary also had the power to consolidate statutes, and issue certificates and licenses. In 1901, the Provincial Secretary administered the creation of a register of all documents filed pursuant to Legislation; this register included a synopsis of each document, its location, and the legislation under which it was filed.

In 1939, the Legislative Library Act established a Public Records and Archives branch within Manitoba's Legislative Library. Years later, a part-time archivist was appointed in 1946, followed by the first full-time archivist (Hartwell W. L. Bowsfield) in 1952, when the Provincial Archives of Manitoba were established within the Library.

At this time, the authority to direct the classification and scheduling of government records was held by the Lieutenant Governor in Council. In 1955, the Public Records Act became the province's first legislation dealing specifically with the destruction, retention, and permanent preservation of public records. Establishing the Provincial Documents Committee, the Act allowed the committee to classify departmental records and create schedules for their retention and disposition. In 1967, John Alexander Bovey became the Provincial Archivist. In 1970, the Public Records Act was repealed and replaced Part II of the Legislative Library Act (RSM 1970 c. L120, s.12). Under this legislation, the restructured Provincial Documents Committee was responsible for administering government-wide records management issues. The Committee eventually signed off on the Records Authority Schedule, which acted as an overriding authority to retain and dispose of the records that it described.

In 1970, the building belonging to the Winnipeg Auditorium was sold by the city to the Province of Manitoba for roughly CA$1 million, and the Archives of Manitoba (and the Legislative Library of Manitoba) would move in the following year. It cost the province $4 million to convert the former Winnipeg Auditorium from an arts and entertainment venue into one for archival storage. After renovations were completed, the location was renamed the Manitoba Archives Building and opened in September 1975.

In 1972, the Archives became a branch of the Department of Tourism, Recreation and Cultural Affairs (currently Manitoba Sport, Culture and Heritage), where it would stay (though the department itself would be restructured several times). 

In 1973, the Hudson's Bay Company decided to move its historical archives to Winnipeg, Manitoba. The official public announcement was made on 31 July 1973, and representatives of HBC and the Manitoba government signed an agreement outlining the terms under which the archives would be placed on deposit at the Provincial Archives of Manitoba. The physical transfer of the archives was completed in the autumn of 1974 and the archives were re-opened to the public in the spring of 1975.

In 1978, a federal study found that per-capita spending on the provincial archives, $252, was lower than some other provinces. From 1980 to 1997, the Provincial Archivist was Peter Bowers, followed by William Gordon Dodds in 1998. 

In 1981, a Government Records Division was established within the Provincial Archives of Manitoba, bringing on a more effective and proactive approach to managing records. In the 1980s, with the increasing use of the modern tape recorder, the Provincial Archives established its "oral history programme" as part of its general mandate to "identify, acquire and preserve records relating to the experience of the people of Manitoba."

As of 1990, the Archives of Manitoba belongs to the Provincial Services Division of Manitoba Sport, Culture and Heritage, along with the Legislative Library and Translation Services.

Part 11 of the Legislative Library Act was replaced by the Archives and Recordkeeping Act—passed in 2001 and proclaimed in February 2003—reflecting changes in archival and recordkeeping practice, as well as changing the name of the Provincial Archives of Manitoba to the Archives of Manitoba. The new legislation also created a new approvals process through the Archivist of Manitoba, superseding the Provincial Documents Committee. 

In 2006, the Archives of Manitoba acquired a small cache of personal, legal, business, and political records of John A. Macdonald and his son Hugh John Macdonald.

In 2008, University of Manitoba graduate Scott Goodine became the Provincial Archivist of Manitoba.

Manitoba Archives Building 
The building that is now known as the Manitoba Archives Building, formerly belonging to Winnipeg Auditorium, was designed by architects G. W. Northwood, C. W. U. Chivers, R. B. Pratt, D. A. Ross, and J. N. Semmens. It was erected between 1931-1932, in the midst of the Great Depression, as a make-work project of the federal, provincial, and municipal governments. Its cornerstone was laid on 18 August 1932 at a ceremony attended by the Governor-General of Canada and was officially opened on 15 October 1932 by Prime Minister R. B. Bennett.

In 1970, the building belonging to the Winnipeg Auditorium was sold by the city to the Province of Manitoba for roughly CA$1 million, and the Archives of Manitoba (and the Legislative Library of Manitoba) would move in the following year. It cost the province $4 million to convert the former Winnipeg Auditorium from an arts and entertainment venue into one for archival storage. Interior renovations included removal of cantilevered balconies from the main auditorium; the exhibition galleries, with their large, arched windows, became the Reading Rooms for the Archives and Library. Some space in the building was reserved for the Departments of Education and Agriculture for documentary/instructional film production. After renovations were completed, the location was renamed the Manitoba Archives Building and opened in September 1975.

History of the HBCA 
In 1920, William Schooling was hired by Hudson's Bay Company (HBC) to write a history of the company. Needing to access the company records, he was provided special premises to store the archives, as well as hiring of support staff, including Richard H.G. Leveson Gower. While the writing of an official company history was abandoned in 1926, Dominion Archivist of Canada Arthur Doughty was hired that year as a consultant to organize the HBC's archives so that selected historical records could be published. By 1927, an early version of a department of archives was in place, though it would be interrupted by the Great Depression along with the ending of Doughty's contract.

With a significant amount of work on the classification, arrangement, and cataloguing of records already accomplished, in 1931, HBC formally established an Archives Department and Leveson Gower was formally appointed the first HBC archivist. In May that year, HBC announced that the archives would be made available to the public and that researchers would be allowed direct access to records created prior to 1870. Quickly developing a classification plan for the records, HBC was able to open its archives to the public in 1933.

In 1973, the HBC decided to move its historical archives to Winnipeg, Manitoba. The official public announcement was made on 31 July 1973, and representatives of HBC and the Manitoba government signed an agreement outlining the terms under which the archives would be placed on deposit at the Provincial Archives of Manitoba. The physical transfer of the archives was completed in the autumn of 1974 and the archives were re-opened to the public in the spring of 1975.

On 21 June 2007, the Hudson’s Bay Company Archives’ records were announced to have been added to the UNESCO Memory of the World Register, a programme that began to protect and promote the world’s documentary heritage. 

In November 2019, the HBCA completed a large-scale microfilm digitization project, with funding from the Hudson’s Bay Company History Foundation.

Collections 
The holdings of the Archives of Manitoba are separated into two primary centres: the Government and Private Sector Archives (GPSA) and the Hudson's Bay Company Archives (HBCA).

Government and Private Sector Archives 
The Government and Private Sector Archives (GPSA) is responsible for the archival records of (1) the Government of Manitoba, (2) the province's private sector, and (3) the province's municipalities and school districts/divisions.

Records of the Manitoba government are preserved with respect to the heritage of the province. These are records that document political and legal decisions; the evolution of provincial administration; and the interaction between the government and its citizens. The archival records of the Manitoba government include the records of the Legislative Assembly, government departments and agencies, crown corporations, commissions of inquiry, and the courts. The Manitoba Archive Building also houses part of the Legislative Library of Manitoba, the other location being the Legislative Building's Reading Room.

Records of the private sector consist of the records of individuals, organizations, and community groups in Manitoba, dating back to the days of the Red River Settlement up to the more recent past. These holdings include correspondence, journals and diaries, organizational records, photographs, posters and documentary art, moving image and sound recordings (including oral histories), cartographic and architectural plans. The Archives of Manitoba also holds a large collection of historical records of the Royal Manitoba Theatre Centre, who donated them to the Archives.

In 2006, the Archives of Manitoba acquired a small cache of personal, legal, business, and political records of John A. Macdonald and his son Hugh John Macdonald. The records relating to John A. Macdonald include material from his legal practice in Kingston and his personal affairs. The latter consists of personal receipts and correspondence. Receipts include those for home and life assurance premiums, for memberships in organizations, mortgage payments, goods purchased for the home and office, and property repairs. Moreover, the records include Macdonald’s account book at the Commercial Bank, 1855 to 1859, and a series of cheque stubs for the years 1863 to 1878 belonging to both Macdonald and James Shannon. The records relating to and created by Hugh John Macdonald were arranged in three series – subject files on personal matters, miscellaneous office files relating to clients, and records of a number of companies which Macdonald and his legal partners were investors or directors of the company. The subject files contain, among other things, tax notices and receipts from the City of Winnipeg for Macdonald’s home at 61 Carlton Street.

Hudson's Bay Company Archives
The Hudson's Bay Company Archives (HBCA) is the official repository for the records of the Hudson's Bay Company (HBC)—the oldest chartered trading company in the world—and includes thousands of mainly hand-written records and maps of HBC employees from 1670–1920, spanning the first 250 years of HBC's history. Along with archival records of the Hudson's Bay Company itself, the HBCA acquires and preserves other records related to HBC history as well, such as private records of individuals and subsidiary companies (including the North West Company).

The records of the HBCA provide the original written history of the Hudson's Bay Company since its inception in 1670 by royal charter of Prince Rupert and others, as well as how the Company would grow to the point of purchasing Rupert's Land—the largest land purchase in Canada's history and one of the largest in world history.

The archives also preserve original written documents that detail the fur trade; European exploration, mapping, and settlement of the western frontier; Indigenous peoples; treaty-making; and the initial development of what would become Canada. Many of these documents provide detailed descriptions of native groups, forts, rivers, lakes, animals, populations, and the difficult working conditions of fur traders.

This important archive is one of Canada's national treasures, and is a part of the United Nations Memory of the World project. HBCA operations are partly funded through the ongoing financial support of the Hudson's Bay Company History Foundation. In 2019, the HBC History Foundation funded HBCA's large-scale microfilm digitization project. This project saw HBCA digitize 1052 reels of microfilm, consisting of more than 10,000 volumes of the pre-1870 records kept at almost 500 HBC posts. Records that were digitized were selected for the project due to being some of the most heavily-accessed records held by HBCA.

Some records available through the Hudson's Bay Company Archives include:

 Francis Heron's account of the Red River Flood of 1826 — Francis Heron, a HBC clerk at Upper Fort Garry (present-day Winnipeg), documented the Red River flood of 1826 in a journal, providing a rare eyewitness account of the destruction that nearly wiped out the Red River Colony in minutes.
 The Hudson's Bay Company and Winnipeg's Urban Landscape — HBCA have documented the HBC’s impact on Winnipeg’s urban development. For instance, blueprint plans by local architect John Woodman show the elevations of two of the outbuildings that surrounded HBC's first Winnipeg department store (built in 1881) at the corner of Main Street and York Avenue.
 Peter Fidler and the Selkirk Treaty — HBC surveyor and post master Peter Fidler wrote about many notable events in the Brandon House journal of 1817-1818, including the Selkirk Treaty.
 Philip Turnor's Map — A large composite map was created by Philip Turnor in 1794 at the end of his career as the HBC’s first official surveyor. The map exhibited most of the first inland exploratory knowledge collected by the HBC at the time.
 The Selkirk Treaty and Map — On 18 July 1817, Lord Selkirk signed a treaty with 5 Indigenous leaders that would establish the Red River Settlement. This treaty is the first formal written agreement in Western Canada recognizing Indigenous land rights. The treaty, as well as a map of the settlement, are two of the legal records relating to the Red River Settlement that were probably acquired by the Archives Department of the HBC from HBC's solicitors in 1923.
 Seven Oaks & HBCA Records: 1816-2016 — The Pemmican Proclamation were issued on 8 January 1814, largely triggering years of conflict among the HBC and the North West Company (NWC), the two main actors of the Canadian fur trade. As hostilities continued to escalate, the two sides met on 19 June 1816 in a violent confrontation at Seven Oaks (now in the area of West Kildonan, Winnipeg). For the 200th anniversary of the Battle of Seven Oaks, the HBCA highlighted records that document the 'Pemmican Wars' era, mainly written from the point of view of HBC servants who eye-witnessed these events.

Exhibits

Manitoba 150 
Commemorating the 150th anniversary of the founding of Manitoba, and the 350th of the Hudson's Bay Company, the Archives of Manitoba dedicated its 2020 exhibit, titled Your Archives: The Histories We Share, to submissions from the public. For the exhibit, people were asked to choose an archival record and explain "why it matters." Selected submissions would then be featured on the Archives' blog, social media, and in their physical exhibit.

In February, the Archives held a screening event at Winnipeg's  Metropolitan Theatre, titled 'Films from the Archives', where they showed The Romance of the Far Fur Country (1920) and the "100th anniversary screening of highlights from the Hudson’s Bay Company film."

Streaming from the Archives 
On Manitoba Day (May 12), the Archives launched its Streaming from the Archives feature—uploading digitized films and videos from the Archives' holdings, including the HBCA, for public viewing online. To begin, the Archives featured 6 films that "illustrate a range of activities and iconic sites throughout Manitoba."

Subsequent uploads since its launch took place in July and December 2020, introduced through more 'Films from the Archives' events, this time held online due to provincial COVID-19 restrictions. On December 9, three "home movies" from the Archives were presented, respectively showing Norway House in the 1930s, Winnipeg during the 1950 flood, and Queen Elizabeth II visiting Brandon in 1959. On December 16, three government "promotional films" from the 1940s, 1950s, and 1960s were presented: one documenting a survey group in northern Manitoba; another, a fashion show featuring made-in-Manitoba designs; and the last, "indoor and outdoor activities to enjoy in Manitoba in winter."

Exhibits 995 to 1000 
The Exhibits 995 to 1000 displays enlarged versions of six of the photographs entered as exhibits in the 1920 trial of R. v. Ivens et al, which followed the Winnipeg General Strike of 1919.

Approximately 30,000 workers went on strike in Winnipeg for nearly six weeks from 15 May 1919. Many leaders of the strike were arrested on 17 June 1919, and the strike would end on 25 June 1919. The leaders were tried in the Court of King's Bench, and most were found guilty and sentenced to up to two years in prison. The Archives of Manitoba holds numerous records that document the 1919 General Strike, including those entered as exhibits in the Court of King's Bench trial of the strike leaders, including R. v. Ivens et al.

The six photographs presented in this exhibit were taken by professional photographer L. B. Foote on 21 June 1919, or "Bloody Saturday." The photos show the crowds, the streetcar, and some of the events of the day. The photos are stamped with a Court of King's Bench exhibit stamp on the back, on which the exhibit number and the clerk's initials are recorded.

Other exhibits 
The Manitoba Legislative Building: Photographing a Work in Progress features reproductions of 34 of photos taken by L. B. Foote, who was commissioned by the  Manitoba government to document the construction of the Legislative Building through photographs. The photos were mostly taken between 1915 and 1916.

Remembering the First World War (2014–2018) were weekly blogs about the time of the First World War, documenting activities both at home and overseas. In 2015, commemorating the 100th anniversary of WWI and Remembrance Day, Archives of Manitoba held a public reading of letters written by Manitoba soldiers who served in the War.

Rearview Manitoba is an exhibit that showcases Manitobans who were revealed in records held by the Archives of Manitoba.

The Sessional Journal of the Legislative Assembly of Assiniboia are one of the key documents held at the Archives of Manitoba relating to the 1870 Legislative Assembly, the first Manitoba Legislature. The journal contains a record of the proceedings of the Assembly, from the first meeting of the First Session on 9 March 1870 until the last meeting of the Third Session on 24 June 1870. This journal was purchased for $40 by the Legislative Library—which was also responsible for the province's archival records at the time—in 1939 from E. R. James of Rosser, Manitoba.

See also
Government archives in Canada
 Library and Archives Canada
Provincial Archives of Alberta
British Columbia Archives
Archives of Ontario
Provincial Archives of New Brunswick
Provincial Archives of Newfoundland and Labrador
Nova Scotia Archives and Records Management
Public Archives and Records Office (Prince Edward Island)
Bibliothèque et Archives nationales du Québec
Provincial Archives of Saskatchewan
Archival organizations in Manitoba
Association for Manitoba Archives
Fort Garry Horse Museum & Archives
Manitoba Historical Society
University of Manitoba Archives & Special Collections

References

External links
 Official website
"An Interview with Manitoba’s New Provincial Archivist, Mr. Peter Bower," by Sharon Babaian. Manitoba History 4. (1982).

Manitoba government departments and agencies
Manitoba, Archives of
Memory of the World Register
Manitoba, Archives of
 
Hudson's Bay Company